Vedra is a municipality in Spain.

Vedra may also refer to:

Places
Es Vedrà, an island off Ibiza, Spain
Vedra, Estonia, a village in Estonia
Vedra Valles, a valley on the planet Mars

Other uses
Es Vedra (song) on the album Metallic Spheres by The Orb
Vedra, a steam pilot tender, formerly  (1904)